Al-Sanamayn (also spelled Sanamein, Sanamain, Sunamein) is a city in southern Syria, administratively part of the Daraa Governorate and the center of al-Sanamayn District. Nearby localities include Kafr Shams to the northwest, Deir al-Bukht to the north, Jabab to the northeast, Bassir to the east, Tubna to the southeast, Inkhil to the southwest and Qayta to the west.

According to the Syria Central Bureau of Statistics (CBS), al-Sanamayn had a population of 26,268 in the 2004 census. In addition to being capital of the al-Sanamayn District, the city is also the administrative center and second largest locality of the al-Sanamayn nahiyah ("subdistrict") which consists of 16 localities with a collective population of 113,316 in 2004. The city's inhabitants are predominantly Sunni Muslims.

History

Roman era
The name al-Sanamayn is Arabic for "the Two Idols." It has been identified with the Roman-era village of Aere, a station mentioned in the Antonine Itinerary on the road between Damascus to the north and Nawa to the south. A temple in al-Sanamayn dedicated to Tyche, the Greek goddess of fortune, has been dated to 191 CE. Another was apparently dedicated to Tyche's Roman equivalent, Fortuna, who was central to Bosra's state cult; it dates from the early to mid-3rd-century CE, during the reign of emperor Septimius Severus. A Batanean inscription from the reign of Roman emperor Julian the Apostate in the mid to late 4th-century was discovered in al-Sanamayn.

Medieval Islamic period
Al-Sanamayn had its own governor under Ikhshidid rule (939–969) until 945 when the Banu Uqayl was entrusted with governing the Hauran region.

A peace treaty between Baldwin I, the Crusader king of Jerusalem, and Toghtekin, the Muslim ruler of Damascus was signed at al-Sanamayn in 1111. The treaty was signed after a Crusader army pursuing Muslim forces to the Lejah was taken by surprise and surrounded at al-Sanamayn. In December 1168 a Zengid army was assembled at al-Sanamayn to launch an expedition towards Egypt to check the suspected independent ambitions of the Fatimid vizier Shirkuh, who was originally dispatched to Egypt by the Zengids to stave off a Crusader invasion. Zengid sultan Nur al-Din awarded each soldier 20 dinars before they departed.

The place was visited by medieval Syrian geographer Yaqut al-Hamawi in the 1220s during Ayyubid rule, and noted it was "a town in the Hauran, 2 marches from Damascus." From the Middle Ages to the present day, the temple dedicated to Tyche was used as a mosque. Today it is also one of the best preserved Roman edifices in Syria.

Ottoman era
As in other towns on the Hajj (Muslim pilgrimage to Mecca) caravan route, the Ottoman sultan Selim I constructed a fortress in al-Sanamayn sometime between 1516 and 1520. Local janissaries were garrisoned at the fortress in al-Sanamayn in contrast to nearby Muzayrib, which was manned by imperial troops. In 1596 the town appeared in the Ottoman  tax registers as Sanamayn and was part of the nahiya (subdistrict) of Bani Kilab in the Hauran Sanjak. It had an entirely Muslim population consisting of 80 households and 37 bachelors. The villagers paid a fixed tax-rate of 20% on various agricultural products, including  wheat, barley, summer crops, goats and beehives, in addition to on a water mill. The total taxes were  18,900 akçe. In 1672, the village contained a congregational mosque with a minaret, two small mosques, a large khan (caravanserai) and hammam (bathhouse), but had no market. The Turkish traveler Evliya Çelebi noted that some prostitutes sought work by the roadside in al-Sanamayn.

In the mid-19th-century, explorer Josias Leslie Porter, noted that the ruins of a few temples were present and that the most "striking building" was a Corinthian-style, ornamented limestone temple that had since been converted to a Christian church. In addition he noted "there are the remains of several large and beautiful buildings, and some of the houses are in the best style of Hauran architecture." Among the features of these structures were large walls, stone doors, roofs and window shutters and basalt character. During roughly the same time period it was reported by the Royal Geographical Society that al-Sanamayn was an entirely Muslim village with about 60 houses and with an entrance marked by large basalt blocks. It belonged to a Turkoman family known as Kawwas-oghlu who maintained encampments between the town and Khan Dannun to the north. Al-Sanamayn was "well supplied with water," contained several bird species and its pools were filled with leeches which would be collected and sold in the markets of Damascus. In 1898 the Baedeker Palestine and Syria: Handbook for travellers noted it as "an excellent example of a Hauran village."

Modern era
Towards the end of World War II the Free French forces maintained a headquarters at al-Sanamayn. Syria was ruled by the French Mandate at the time.

Al-Sanamayn was among the first cities to stage mass demonstrations against the government of Bashar al-Assad on 18 March 2011, joining other Hauran cities like Daraa, Inkhil, Jasim and Da'el. According to opposition activists security forces did not fire on demonstrators that day. On 25 March, however, 20 protesters were shot and killed by government forces after burning down a statue of late president Hafez al-Assad, the current president's father. An opposition activist in Damascus claimed that several protesters – as many as 20 according to some witnesses – were killed while attempting to march towards Daraa in a show of solidarity before being attacked by security forces, although that claim could not be confirmed. A government official claimed an armed group assaulted the Syrian Army headquarters in al-Sanamayn. Al-Sanamayn is base to the 9th Division's 15th Brigade. Activists alleged that on 18 September an eleven-year boy was killed after being shot in the head by security forces during a boycott protest by students in al-Sanamayn on the first day of the 2011–2012 school year.

Local rebels were active in Sanamayn, and controlled large parts of the city, but never completely controlled the city as it was home to a number of military security centers, and the 9th division. Rebels would engage in small scale clashes or attack army positions with projectiles such as mortars. The town was besieged by the Syrian Army and shelling commenced. Rebels and civilians in the town entered negotiations that concluded with a reconciliation agreement in which the rebels were to hand over their weapons and pledge not to carry out attacks against the government. They, along with draft-dodgers were also ordered to join the regular forces and the Russian-led 5th corps. 500 people including 150 rebel fighters signed the agreement, and Sanamayn came under nominal government control.

Following the 2018 Southern Syria offensive, one of the terms of the reconciliation agreements was to allow civilians and rebel fighters to return to homes they were displaced from. Multiple civilians and former rebels returned to Sanamyan. Like other areas of Daraa governorate, Sanamayn became the frequent location of attacks against the Syrian Army and pro-government militias. Walid al-Zahra, a former commander and one of the rebels who returned to Sanmayn in 2018, led many of these attacks.

Sanamayn was stormed by the Syrian Army in the 2020 Daraa clashes. Following this, the fighters either reconciled and settled their status or were evacuated to rebel-held northwest Syria.

Climate
Al-Sanamayn has a cold semi-arid climate (Köppen climate classification: BSk). Rainfall is higher in winter than in summer. About  of precipitation falls annually.

References

Bibliography

External links
Burns, Ross. Pictures of the Roman temple in al-Sanamayn. Monuments of Syria. 2011-12-06.
 Map of the town, Google Maps
 Sanameine-map; 19L

Cities in Syria
Populated places in Al-Sanamayn District